Castor was a merchantman launched in 1782. She made one voyage for the British East India Company (EIC). Her owners sold her in 1799. She was last listed in 1808.

Lloyd's Register

On 10 September 1793, Captain Joseph Salkeld, received a letter of marque for Castor.

Salkeld sailed Castor from Portsmouth on 17 May 1796, bound for Bengal. She reached the Cape on 2 August and remained there until 10 December. She arrived at Calcutta on 8 March 1797. Homeward bound, she was at Diamond Harbour on 7 June, and reached St Helena on 3 September. She left St Helena on 26 September and arrived at The Downs on 30 January 1798. Castor was at Ramsgate on 6 February 1798.

Lloyd's List for 2 February reported that Castor, Salkeld, master, from Bengal, had been run afoul of by Minerva, Blaney, master, in The Downs. Castor was onshore at Ramsgate, and the cargo was expected to be saved. The EIC reported that part of the cargo was saved, and put the value of the cargo that it had lost on Castor at £7878.

By one report, her owners sold Castor to Dutch owners in 1800. Salkeld had by then become master of Minerva and was on his way to Australia, transporting convicts. That same source states that in 1802 Curling and Co., of London, purchased Castor for use as a West Indiaman. 

However, by 1799 Curling & Co. already owned Castor. Her master was Mackenzie, and her trade London - Jamaica. She had been lengthened in 1796, and as a result, her burthen was now 467 tons. She had also undergone a thorough repair in 1799. Apparently her new owners chose not to arm her, let alone apply for a letter of marque.

Lloyd's Register

Register of Shipping

Notes, citations, and references
Notes

Citations

References
 
  

Ships of the British East India Company
1782 ships
Ships built in England
Age of Sail merchant ships
Merchant ships of the United Kingdom
Maritime incidents in 1798
Shipwrecks of England